Oriflame Holding AG is a Swedish multinational multi-level marketing company that sells beauty and personal care products directly to consumers online through a network of independent sellers. Oriflame was founded on Jan 1, 1967 in Sweden by brothers Jonas af Jochnick and Robert af Jochnick, and their friend Bengt Hellsten. 

The head office of Oriflame is located in Schaffhausen, Switzerland, with a registered office in Stockholm, Sweden. Oriflame was traded on the Nasdaq Stockholm until being delisted on 17 July 2019.

Operations

The company has approximately 6,000 employees, 1,000 products, and a turnover of over 1.3 billion Euro. As of August 2020, Oriflame operates in more than 60 countries, where its beauty products are marketed by over 3 million Oriflame Brand Partners.

Oriflame has two Indian manufacturing plants in Noida and Roorkee. It also manufactures products in Russia, Poland, and China.

References

External links

 
 

Multi-level marketing companies
Cosmetics brands
Personal care brands
Swedish brands
Swedish companies established in 1967
Retail companies established in 1967
Companies formerly listed on Nasdaq Stockholm